Harbour Town is a shopping centre concept that incorporates multiple factory outlets in one centre. As of February 2021, there are two locations owned and operated under the Harbour Town brand: Biggera Waters, on Queensland's Gold Coast, and at Adelaide Airport, in South Australia. Harbour Town centres also operated in Perth, Western Australia and Docklands, Victoria before being sold off and rebranded.

Current centres

Gold Coast

Harbour Town Gold Coast is situated on the corner of the Gold Coast Highway and Oxley Drive Biggera Waters, Queensland. Opening in 1999 and located on the Gold Coast Highway just 20 minutes north of Surfers Paradise en route to theme parks, Harbour Town was the first and is still the largest purpose-built brand direct factory outlet shopping centre in Australia.

Adelaide

Harbour Town Adelaide opened in 2003, and is situated next to the Adelaide Airport, South Australia. It features over 130 outlet stores along with supermarkets, chemists, cafes and eateries, fresh food, homewares and outdoor products.

Former centres

Perth
A Harbor Town centre in Perth, Western Australia opened in 2003. In October 2013 it was sold to the Far East Organization of Singapore and rebranded to Watertown Brand Outlet Centre. It was constructed and formerly owned by the Lewis Land Group in a joint venture with ING Real Estate Development Australia.

Melbourne
A Harbor Town centre in Docklands, Victoria opened in 2008. It was sold in March 2014 and rebranded to The District Docklands in 2017.

See also
Direct Factory Outlets

References

External links

Harbour Town Australia home page
Harbour Town Adelaide
Harbour Town Gold Coast

Shopping centres in Adelaide
Shopping malls established in 1999
Shopping centres on the Gold Coast, Queensland
Outlet malls in Australia
1999 establishments in Australia